Lancelot William Joynson-Hicks, 3rd Viscount Brentford (10 April 1902 – 25 February 1983), known as Sir Lancelot William Joynson-Hicks, Bt from 1942 to 1958, was a British Conservative politician.

Background and education
Joynson-Hicks was the second son of former Home Secretary William Joynson-Hicks, 1st Viscount Brentford and Grace Lynn Joynson. He was educated at Sandroyd School then Winchester College and Trinity College, Oxford.

Political career
Joynson-Hicks later became a solicitor and a farmer. He served in the Second World War as a lieutenant-commander in the Royal Navy Volunteer Reserve. He sat as Member of Parliament (MP) for Chichester from 1942 to 1958 and served under Winston Churchill as Parliamentary Secretary to the Ministry of Fuel and Power from 1951 to 1955. In 1956 he was created a Baronet, of Newick in the County of Sussex. On the death of his older brother, Richard Joynson-Hicks, 2nd Viscount Brentford, in 1958, he succeeded as Viscount Brentford. As a peer he was disqualified from sitting in the House of Commons, and a by-election was triggered.

Lord Brentford was also Chairman of the Automobile Association and served as a member of the House of Laity in the National Assembly of the Church of England.

Family
Lord Brentford married Phyllis Allfey (d. 1979), daughter of Herbert Cyril Allfey, in 1931. They had one son. He died in 1983, aged 80, and was succeeded in his titles by his only child Crispin.

Arms

References

External links

1902 births
1983 deaths
Joynson-Hicks, Lancelot
Viscounts in the Peerage of the United Kingdom
People educated at Sandroyd School
People educated at Winchester College
Alumni of Trinity College, Oxford
Royal Navy officers
Joynson-Hicks, Lancelot William
Joynson-Hicks, Lancelot William
Joynson-Hicks, Lancelot William
Joynson-Hicks, Lancelot William
Joynson-Hicks, Lancelot William
UK MPs who inherited peerages
Royal Naval Volunteer Reserve personnel of World War II
Conservative Party (UK) hereditary peers
Ministers in the third Churchill government, 1951–1955
Ministers in the Eden government, 1955–1957
Royal Naval Reserve personnel